The 1899 Western Conference football season was the fourth season of college football played by the member schools of the Western Conference (later known as the Big Ten Conference) and was a part of the 1899 college football season.

The 1899 Chicago Maroons football team, under head coach Amos Alonzo Stagg, won the conference championship with a 16–0–2 overall record (4–0 against conference opponents), led the conference in both scoring offense (28.1 points per game) and scoring defense (1.6 points per game), shut out 13 of 18 opponents, and outscored all opponents by a combined total of 505 to 28.

Season overview

Results and team statistics

Key

PPG = Average of points scored per game
PAG = Average of points allowed per game

Regular season

Only 12 conference games were played during the 1899 Western Conference season. The results were as follows:

 October 14, 1899: Wisconsin defeated Northwestern, 38-0, at Madison, Wisconsin
 October 28, 1899: Michigan defeated Illinois, 5-0, at Champaign, Illinois
 November 4, 1899: Chicago defeated Purdue, 44-0, at Chicago
 November 4, 1899: Northwestern defeated Minnesota, 11-0, at Minneapolis
 November 11, 1899: Chicago defeated Northwestern, 76-0, at Chicago
 November 11, 1899: Wisconsin defeated Illinois, 23-0, at Milwaukee
 November 18, 1899: Wisconsin defeated Minnesota, 19-0, at Minneapolis
 November 22, 1899: Purdue defeated Illinois, 5-0, at West Lafayette, Indiana
 November 25, 1899: Chicago defeated Minnesota, 29-0, at Chicago
 November 25, 1899: Northwestern defeated Purdue, 29-0, at Evanston, Illinois
 November 30, 1899: Wisconsin defeated Michigan, 17-5, at Chicago
 December 9, 1899: Chicago defeated Wisconsin, 17-0, at Madison, Wisconsin

Notable non-conference games during the 1899 season included the following:
 October 4, 1899: Chicago defeated Notre Dame, 23–6, at Chicago
 October 14, 1899: Illinois lost to Indiana, 5–0, at Champaign, Illinois
 October 18, 1899: Michigan defeated Notre Dame, 12–0, at Ann Arbor, Michigan
 October 21, 1899: Minnesota defeated Iowa State, 6–0, at Minneapolis
 October 7, 1899: Chicago tied with Iowa, 5–5, at Chicago
 October 14, 1899: Chicago defeated Cornell, 17–6, at Chicago
 October 21, 1899: Wisconsin lost to Yale, 6–0, at New Haven, Connecticut
 October 28, 1899: Chicago tied with Penn, 5–5, at Chicago
 October 28, 1899: Northwestern lost to Notre Dame, 12–0, at South Bend, Indiana
 November 4, 1899: Michigan defeated Virginia, 38–0, at Detroit
 November 11, 1899: Michigan lost to Penn, 11–10, at Philadelphia
 November 18, 1899: Northwestern defeated Indiana, 11–6, at Evanston, Illinois
 November 18, 1899: Purdue tied Notre Dame, 10–10, at West Lafayette, Indiana
 November 25, 1899: Illinois defeated , 29–0, at St. Louis
 November 30, 1899: Chicago defeated Brown, 17–6, at Chicago
 November 30, 1899: Purdue lost to Indiana, 17–5, at West Lafayette, Indiana
 November 30, 1899: Illinois lost to Iowa, 58–0, at Champaign, Illinois

Bowl games
No bowl games were played during the 1899 season.

Awards and honors

All-Western players

The Northwestern named a 1899 All-Western college football team that consisted of the following players:

 Neil Snow, end, Michigan
 James M. Sheldon, end, Chicago
 Arthur Hale Curtis, tackle, Wisconsin 
 Jonathan E. Webb, tackle, Chicago 
 Richard France, guard, Michigan 
 C. Rogers, guard, Wisconsin 
 Roy Chamberlain, center, Wisconsin 
 Walter S. Kennedy, quarterback, Chicago 
 Ralph C. Hamill, halfback, Chicago 
 John McLean, halfback, Michigan
 Pat O'Dea, fullback, Wisconsin

All-Americans

No Western Conference players were selected as first-team players on the 1899 College Football All-America Teams selected by Walter Camp and Caspar Whitney. However, the Philadelphhia Inquirer picked an All-American that named four Western Conference players to the first team: end Neil Snow of Michigan; tackle Richard France of Michigan; quarterback Walter S. Kennedy of Chicago; and halfback John McLean of Michigan.

References